The Sable Offshore Energy Project (SOEP) is a consortium based in Halifax, Nova Scotia which explores for and produced natural gas near Sable Island on the edge of the Nova Scotian continental shelf in eastern Canada.

The first tier was completed in 1999 resulting in the development of the Thebaud, North Triumph, and Venture natural gas fields.

History 
In 1979 the drill rig Gulftide struck success and the Venture field was discovered.  At the time, the cost of developing the gas field proved prohibitive.  Extreme North Atlantic Ocean weather and low natural gas prices were blamed.  In 1995, improvements in drilling technology along with an increase in natural gas prices made recovering the gas economy allowing SOEP to emerge.  In January ground was broken for the Goldboro gas plant.  In November, the Galaxy II rig spuds the first production well at the Thebaud field.  The Thebaud platform and wellhead were installed in August 1999.  In September, the sub-sea pipeline, linking the Sable Island fields to Goldboro gas plant 225 km (140 mi) away, was completed.  In November, construction of the fractionation plant and gas plant were completed and the first natural gas was recovered a month later offshore.  First gas shipped to market in January 2000.

Geology
The Venture Gas Field was discovered in 1979 when the Venture D-23 well was drilled and is located a few miles off the east end of Sable Island on the Scotian Shelf in 12–20 m of water.  The structural trap consists of an east-west trending anticline bounded on the north by a fault, with gas occurring in multiple Upper Jurassic to Lower Cretaceous sandstone reservoirs 1600 m thick at depths from 4 to 6 km.

Fields 
The fields of SOEP are being developed in two stage, with the cost of development of an estimated field life of 25 years. The Thebaud, North Triumph, and Venture were developed in the first stage and completed in 1999.

The first Phase II platform, Alma, came onstream in late 2003 while production from South Venture, the second field began late in 2004. Due to the long exploit of the rig it has been closed for maintenance and repairs which are currently on going.

Facilities 
Offshore
Thebaud Processing Facility
Venture platform
North Triumph platform
Alma Facilities
South Venture platform

Onshore
Goldboro Gas Plant (Goldboro, Guysborough County)
Point Tupper Fractionation Plant (Point Tupper, Richmond County)

Consortium partners 
ExxonMobil Canada Properties Limited
Shell Canada Limited
Imperial Oil
Mosbacher Operating Limited
Cona Resources Ltd.

See also
Maritimes & Northeast Pipeline pipeline infrastructure to deliver gas

References

External links 
 SOEP homepage
 Information on SOEP at offshore-technology.com
 Canada - Nova Scotia Offshore Petroleum Board
 Map of Canadian Oil and gas infrastructure

Natural gas fields in Canada
Energy in Nova Scotia
Companies based in Halifax, Nova Scotia
Guysborough County, Nova Scotia
Richmond County, Nova Scotia
ExxonMobil oil and gas fields
Sable Island